Robert Anderson Irion (July 7, 1804 – March 2, 1861) was a physician, surveyor and Secretary of State of Texas under Sam Houston's first presidency of the Republic of Texas.

Early life
Irion was born in Paris, Tennessee, in 1804 to John Poindexter Irion and Maacha (White) Irion. He was trained as physician graduating from Transylvania University in Lexington, Kentucky, in March, 1826. He began practicing medicine in Vicksburg, Mississippi. In 1832, following the death of his first wife, Ann Vick, he moved to Texas, first practicing medicine in San Augustine. He subsequently moved to Nacogdoches, where he became a surveyor and later, as tensions with Mexico rose, he resumed his practice of medicine.

During the Texas Republic
On September 14, 1835, Irion was elected to the Committee of Safety and Vigilance for Nacogdoches and on April 14, 1836, was a commandant of Nacogdoches Municipality. Irion served as a senator from Nacogdoches in the 1st Congress of the Republic of Texas, from October 4, 1836, to June 13, 1837. Texas President Sam Houston appointed him secretary of state of the Republic of Texas in 1837, and Irion traveled to the United States, Canada, England, and Europe representing Texas until President Mirabeau B. Lamar appointed Barnard E. Bee, Sr. to succeed him on December 13, 1838.

Personal life 
In March 1840, Irion married Anna W. Raguet (born 1819). She had been courted by Sam Houston who obtained a divorce from his first wife April 8, 1837. In wooing her, Houston had used Irion, his Secretary of State in the Republic of Texas, to carry messages between her and himself. When Irion understood that she was definitely not interested in marrying Houston, he persuaded her to accept his proposal of marriage. They had five children together.

Memorials
Irion County, Texas is named after Robert Irion.

References

External links
 

Secretaries of State of Texas
Republic of Texas Senators
1st Congress of the Republic of Texas
1804 births
1861 deaths
Transylvania University alumni
People from Paris, Tennessee
People from Nacogdoches, Texas
Irion County, Texas
19th-century American politicians